James C. Enochs High School is a high school in Modesto, California.  It is a member of the CIF Sac-Joaquin Section#Central California Athletic League CCAL and has multiple MMC championship titles from the prior athletic league. The school is locally known for having the highest academic performance index of any high school in Stanislaus County, with an API of 820 in 2011. The school has four "career pathway programs": Cinema and Graphic Arts, Employment Opportunities, Forensic/Biotech Science, and Pre-Vet Science.

History
The school was constructed with funding from Measure T, passed in 2001 by Modesto voters. The bond provided $65 million to build both Enochs High and Joseph Gregori High School in Modesto. However, when Enochs opened in 2006, it had already cost $101.4 million to build.

Enochs High is named for James C. Enochs, superintendent of Modesto City Schools from 1986 to 2004.

The school added a swimming pool in the fall of 2014.

In 2017, Enochs earned a silver medal from U.S. News & World Report for the magazine's Best High Schools ranking, placing 496th in California and 2,594th in the United States.

Academics
AP Courses:
AP Biology
AP Calculus AB
AP Calculus BC
AP Chemistry
AP English Language and Composition
AP English Literature and Composition
AP European History
AP Human Geography
AP Physics 1
AP Psychology
AP Spanish Language and Culture
AP Statistics
AP United States Government and Politics
AP United States History
Pre-AP/Honors:
Pre-AP Biology
Pre-AP Chemistry
Pre-AP English 9
Pre-AP English 10
Pre-AP Physics
Pre-AP Pre-Calculus
Pre-AP Secondary Math I
Pre-AP Secondary Math II

Extracurricular activities

Athletics
Enochs competes in the Modesto Metro Conference (MMC) in the following sports:
 Baseball
 Basketball
 Cross country
 Football
 Golf
 Soccer
 Softball
 Swimming
 Track and field
 Tennis
 Volleyball
 Wrestling
 Water polo

Performing arts

The Enochs Instrumental Music and Color Guard program includes three concert bands (Wind Ensemble I, Symphonic band, and Concert Band), a jazz band, a pep band, a marching band, an orchestra, winter guard, winter percussion ensemble and also once included a winter winds group.

The James C. Enochs High School Marching Band and Color Guard competes in the Western Band Association (WBA) in Class AAA and in the Northern California Band Association (NCBA) in Class AAA. The group has advanced to WBA Grand Championships twice, once in 2014 in Class AA and once in 2017 in Class AAA.

The Winter Guard and Winter Percussion Ensemble compete in and host competitions for the Central Valley Guard and Percussion Circuit (CVGPC), and they compete as Scholastic A ensembles with Winter Guard International (WGI). The percussion ensemble has also competed in the Northern California Percussion Alliance (NCPA). The group held a record breaking winter percussion season in 2018 in the Scholastic Open class, going undefeated at every competition.

References

External links

High schools in Stanislaus County, California
Education in Modesto, California
Public high schools in California
2006 establishments in California
Educational institutions established in 2006